The 2014 League of Ireland Cup, also known as the 2014 EA Sports Cup, was the 41st season of the Irish football knockout competition.

Dundalk defeated Shamrock Rovers 3–2 in the final on 20 September.

First round
The draw for the First Round took place on 12 February 2014. The First Round games were played on the 10 March 2014.

Second round

Quarter finals

Semifinals

Final

References

Lea
Cup
League of Ireland Cup seasons